Laona is a town in Forest County, Wisconsin, United States. The population was 1,212 at the 2010 census. The census-designated place of Laona is located in the town. The unincorporated community of Blackwell Junction is also located partially in the town.

History
Laona was platted in 1899 when the railroad was extended to that point. It was named in honor of the daughter of a local businessman. A post office has been in operation in Laona since 1900.

Geography

The latitude of Laona is 45.564N. The longitude is −88.673W. It is in the Central Standard time zone.

Demographics
As of the census of 2000, there were 1,367 people, 564 households, and 395 families residing in the town. The population density was 13.2 people per square mile (5.1/km2). There were 850 housing units at an average density of 8.2 per square mile (3.2/km2). The racial makeup of the town was 95.90% White, 0.44% African American, 2.41% Native American, 0.07% Asian, 0.07% from other races, and 1.10% from two or more races. Hispanic or Latino of any race were 0.37% of the population.

There were 564 households, out of which 32.1% had children under the age of 18 living with them, 57.1% were married couples living together, 9.6% had a female householder with no husband present, and 29.8% were non-families. 27.1% of all households were made up of individuals, and 13.1% had someone living alone who was 65 years of age or older. The average household size was 2.42 and the average family size was 2.91.

In the town, the population was spread out, with 26.1% under the age of 18, 5.9% from 18 to 24, 26.0% from 25 to 44, 23.2% from 45 to 64, and 18.8% who were 65 years of age or older. The median age was 40 years. For every 100 females, there were 92.8 males. For every 100 females age 18 and over, there were 91.3 males.

The median income for a household in the town was $31,852, and the median income for a family was $41,042. Males had a median income of $29,674 versus $21,154 for females. The per capita income for the town was $15,652. About 8.7% of families and 11.2% of the population were below the poverty line, including 14.7% of those under age 18 and 6.2% of those age 65 or over.

Recreation

The community is the site of the Lumberjack Steam Train, an operating turn-of-the-century passenger train and award-winning museum.

In the winter, Laona is home to the 100 Mile Snow Safari or "100 miler", one of Wisconsin's oldest and most distinctive snowmobiling trails. With dozens of undeveloped lakes and miles of undeveloped timberland to ride through, it is one of Wisconsin's most popular snowmobiling trails.

References

External links
Laona School District
Laona's town history website

Towns in Forest County, Wisconsin
Company towns in Wisconsin
Towns in Wisconsin